Shottesbrooke Park is a Grade II* listed country house and park in Shottesbrooke, Berkshire, England, southwest of Maidenhead. The house is a Tudor mansion, built in the 16th century. St John the Baptist Church, Shottesbrooke lies next to the grounds of Shottesbrooke.

History
A 17th century Speaker of the House of Commons, Henry Powle, lived at the Park.

In the 18th century and early 19th century, the estate was owned by the Vansittart family and was the seat of Arthur Vansittart, one of the verderers of Windsor Forest. Vansittart was reported to have been 79 years of age upon his death in 1804, and his son and grandson shared the same name. In 1858, it was known to have been occupied by Francis Cherry, guardian of Thomas Hearne, who owned the house for well over 40 years. In 1874, it was reported that house was often repaired by a Robert Nelson.

Until his death in 2007, the Park was the home of their heir and relation-by-marriage, Sir John Smith, the founder of the Landmark Trust which has its headquarters in the adjoining farmhouse.

In 1964, the famous "Great Steam Fair" was held for three days at Shottesbrooke Park.  This is widely considered to be the forerunner of today's steam and vintage rallies in England, such as the Great Dorset Steam Fair.

References

Country houses in Berkshire
Grade II* listed buildings in Berkshire
Tudor architecture
Grade II* listed houses